The 1988–89 season was the 80th year of football played by Dundee United, and covers the period from 1 July 1988 to 30 June 1989. United finished in fourth place, securing UEFA Cup football for the following season.

Match results
Dundee United played a total of 50 competitive matches during the 1988–89 season. The team finished fourth in the Scottish Premier Division.

In the cup competitions, United lost in the quarter-finals of the Scottish Cup to eventual runners-up Rangers and lost in the Skol Cup semi-finals to Aberdeen, who also finished as losers in the final. Romanian side Dinamo Bucharest knocked United out of the Cup Winners' Cup in the second round.

Legend

All results are written with Dundee United's score first.

Premier Division

Scottish Cup

Skol Cup

Cup Winners' Cup

Player details
During the 1988–89 season, United used 31 different players comprising four nationalities. Maurice Malpas was the only player to play in every match. The table below shows the number of appearances and goals scored by each player.

|}

Goalscorers
United had 17 players score with the team scoring 60 goals in total. The top goalscorer was Mixu Paatelainen, who finished the season with 17 goals.

Team statistics

League table

Transfers

In
The club signed four players during the season with a total public cost of at least £450,000 (one figure unknown).

Out
Seven players were sold by the club during the season with a public total of at least £1.1m (some figures unavailable). One player also retired.

Playing kit

The jerseys were sponsored by Belhaven for a second season.

Trivia
All four of United's matches against Hearts finished 0–0.

See also
1988–89 in Scottish football

References

External links
Glenrothes Arabs 1988–89 season review

1988-89
Scottish football clubs 1988–89 season